Kim Davis is an American corporate executive, currently serving as a vice-president with the NHL.

Career 
Davis graduated from Spelman College in Atlanta in the late 1970s with a degree in economics.

Beginning in 1991, Davis worked as a director for JPMorgan Chase, including serving as president of the JPMorgan Chase Foundation. In 1995, she became the first African American woman to be promoted to a senior vice president position at the bank. After over twenty years with the company, she would leave JPMorgan to become Senior Managing Director at Teneo.

In December 2017, she began a new role as Executive Vice President, Social Impact, Growth Initiatives & Legislative Affairs for the National Hockey League, with a particular impact in improving diversity within the league. In 2020, the NHL announced the formation of its Executive Inclusion Council.

References

Living people
African-American sports executives and administrators
African-American women in business
Spelman College alumni
Women ice hockey executives
National Hockey League executives
JPMorgan Chase employees
Year of birth missing (living people)